Thomas Pigott (c. 1526 – 1579) was an English politician.

Career
Thomas Pigott of Doddershall was High Sheriff of Buckinghamshire in 1552–3, and in 1557-8, and a Member (MP) of the Parliament of England for Bedfordshire in 1559. 

He was married to Katherine Langston, daughter of Christopher Langston, Buckinghamshire. They had one son named Thomas Pigott, Justice of the Peace, who became the father of Thomas Pigott (Aylesbury MP). He also had a daughter named Elizabeth, who married to Judge John Lloyd.

References

1526 births
1579 deaths
High Sheriffs of Bedfordshire
High Sheriffs of Buckinghamshire
English MPs 1559